Bajmok is a village located in the municipality of Subotica, in the North Bačka District, Vojvodina, Serbia. The village is ethnically mixed and its population numbered 7,414 inhabitants as of 2011 census.

Name
In Serbian Cyrillic the village is known as Бајмок, in Serbian Latin as Bajmok, in Hungarian as Bajmok, in Bunjevac as Bajmok or Bajmak, in Croatian as Bajmak (since 2009) or Bajmok (before 2009), and in German as Nagelsdorf.

History

The first written documents relating to Bajmok came from the fifteenth century. Then the village was for the first time officially mentioned as a village. King Matthias gave it to his mother, Erzebet Szilágyi. The deed of donation was confirmed on 16 February 1462.

During Ottoman administration (16th-17th century), two villages with this name were mentioned: Bajmok and Novi Bajmok. Both villages had about 20 houses. Population was composed of ethnic Serbs. These villages existed until the beginning of the 18th century when they were abandoned.

The village was rebuilt between 1770 and 1785. In this time, settlers were mainly Bunjevci and Hungarians. At the time of the Hungarian revolution, in the fields of this village there was a conflict between the Hungarian and the Vojvodinian Serb army, won by the Hungarians.

In 1910, population of the village was mainly composed of Hungarians, Bunjevci and Germans, with some Serbs living there as well.

After World War I, new Serb settlers came to the village. During the Second World War, this village was under the Hungarian occupation. Many of the citizens  were exiled from their homes (including the Hungarian population) to make room for Csango newcomers. Bajmok was liberated from the Hungarian fascists on 19 October 1944.

After World War II, 2,090 (mostly Serb) colonists settled in Bajmok, which enlarged village population to 11,789.

Until 1991, the largest ethnic group in the village were Hungarians. By the 2002 census, Serbs were listed as the single largest ethnic group in Bajmok.

Demographics

According to the last official census done in 2011, the village of Bajmok has 7,414 inhabitants.

Ethnic groups
The ethnic composition of the village according to the 2002 census:
 2,900 (33.78%) Serbs
 2,450 (28.54%) Hungarians
 1,266 (14.75%) Bunjevci
 700 (8.15%) Croats
 454 (5.29%) Yugoslavs
 102 (1.19%) Montenegrins
 653 (8.3%) others

See also
 List of places in Serbia
 List of cities, towns and villages in Vojvodina

References

External links 

 www.bajmok.co.rs 
 www.subotica.com/tag/bajmok 
 www.subotica.rs/sr/1051/mz-bajmok 

Populated places in Vojvodina
Places in Bačka
Subotica